Kenneth D. Ridgway is a professor at Purdue University's Department of Earth, Atmospheric, and Planetary Sciences. He has been recognized by the Geological Society of America with the Randolph W. "Bill" and Cecile T. Bromery Award for Minorities. His research interests include sedimentary geology, basin analysis, tectonics, and petroleum geology. Ridgway identifies as a Lenape (Delaware) Indian and has been actively contributing to promoting minority student participation in the earth sciences through professional societies such as the Society for Advancement of Chicanos and Native Americans in Science (SACNAS), the American Indian Science and Engineering Society (AISES), and the American Geological Institute (AGI).

Education 
 1992 University of Rochester, Ph.D., Geological Sciences
 1986 Indiana University, M.S., Geology
 1981 West Virginia University, B.S. Geology

Awards and honors 
 2012 - Geological Society of America Bromery Award 
 2012 - Purdue University Dreamer Award 
 2011 - Fellow – Geological Society of America 
 2009 - College of Science, Graduate Student Mentoring Award
 1998 - School of Science Faculty Award for Outstanding Assistant Professor in Teaching and Research

Selected publications 
 Finzel E.S., and K.D. Ridgway, (2017) Links between sedimentary basin development and Pacific Basin plate kinematics recorded in Jurassic to Miocene strata on the western Alaska Peninsula, Lithosphere, L592-1, doi: 10.1130/L592.1 
 Dunn, C. A., Enkelmann , E., Ridgway, K.D.,  and Allen, W.K., (2017) Source to sink  evaluation of sediment routing in the Gulf of Alaska and Southeast Alaska: a thermochronometric perspective, Journal of Geophysical Research: Earth Surface, 122, doi:10.1002/2016JF004168

References 

1958 births
Living people
Fellows of the Geological Society of America
Purdue University faculty
People from Bridgeton, New Jersey